Dysgonia lilacea is a moth of the family Noctuidae first described by George Thomas Bethune-Baker in 1906. It is found in New Guinea.

References

Dysgonia